The Hymn to Life is a musical composition for mixed chorus and orchestra by German philosopher Friedrich Nietzsche.

Origin
In 1884, Nietzsche wrote to Gast: "This time, 'music' will reach you. I want to have a song made that could also be performed in public in order to seduce people to my philosophy." With this request, Gast reworked Lebensgebet into Friendship, and it was orchestrated by Pietro Gasti.

See also
List of works by Friedrich Nietzsche

References

External links
Nietzsche's music in four volumes.
Nietzsche as Composer

Choral compositions
Compositions by Friedrich Nietzsche